Daniel "Danny" Trejo   (born 29 April 1998) is a Mexican professional footballer who plays as a forward for Phoenix Rising in USL Championship.

Career

College & Amateur 
In 2017, Trejo attended California State University, Northridge to play college soccer. In three seasons with the Matadors, Trejo made 58 appearances, scoring 26 goals and tallying 15 assists. Trejo's achievements at CSUN during his time there include 2019 Big West Offensive Player of the Year, 2019 CSUN Big West Scholar-Athlete of the Year, 2019 Second Team All-Region, 2019 First Team All-Conference, 2019 Academic All-Conference, 2018 Second Team All-Region, 2018 First Team All-Conference, and 2017 Big West All-Freshman Team. The 2020 season in the Big West Conference was cancelled due to the COVID-19 pandemic.

During the 2018 and 2019 seasons, Trejo also played in the USL League Two with Portland Timbers U23s and FC Golden State Force.

Professional
In Fall 2020, Trejo signed his first professional contract with the Los Angeles Force in the National Independent Soccer Association. He started both of the team's Fall 2020 regular season matches and all four matches in the NISA Fall Championship, including the semifinal against Detroit City FC, and scored a goal against the New York Cosmos in the final group stage match on September 28.

On January 21, 2021, Trejo was selected 14th overall in the 2021 MLS SuperDraft by Los Angeles FC.  On April 5, 2021, it was announced that Trejo had signed with Los Angeles FC's USL Championship affiliate side Las Vegas Lights.

Trejo signed an MLS contract with Los Angeles FC on August 19, 2022. Following the 2022 season, his contract option was declined by Los Angeles.

Trejo joined USL Championship side Phoenix Rising on January 26, 2023.

Personal
Trejo was born in Morelia, Mexico, but grew up in Mendota, California.

Career statistics

Club

Honours
Los Angeles FC
Supporters' Shield: 2022

References

External links

NISA page
CSUN bio

1998 births
American soccer players
Association football forwards
Cal State Northridge Matadors men's soccer players
FC Golden State Force players
Los Angeles Force players
Las Vegas Lights FC players
Living people
Los Angeles FC draft picks
Los Angeles FC players
Major League Soccer players
National Independent Soccer Association players
Phoenix Rising FC players
Portland Timbers U23s players
Soccer players from California
USL League Two players
USL Championship players
Sportspeople from Fresno County, California
Sportspeople from Morelia